The CDC 1700 was a 16-bit word minicomputer, manufactured by the Control Data Corporation with deliveries beginning in May 1966.

Over the years there were several versions.  The original 1700 was constructed using air-cooled CDC 6600-like cordwood logic modules and core memory, although later models used different technology.  The final models, called Cyber-18, added four general-purpose registers and a number of instructions to support a time-sharing operating system.

Hardware
The 1700 used ones' complement arithmetic and an ASCII-based character set, and supported memory write protection on an individual word basis.  It had one general-purpose register and two indexing registers (one of which was implemented as a dedicated memory location). The instruction set was fairly simple and supported seven storage addressing modes, including multilevel (chained) indirect addressing.

Although described as a 16-bit system, the basic core storage memory was 4,096 18-bit words, each comprising
 16 data bits
 a parity bit, and
 a program protection bit;memory could be expanded to 32,768 words; I/O was in units of 8 or 16 bits.

Peripherals
Available peripherals included teletypewriters, paper tape readers/punches, punched card readers/punches, line printers, magnetic tape drives, magnetic drums, fixed and removable magnetic disk drives, display terminals, communications controllers, Digigraphic display units, timers, etc.  These interfaced to the processor using unbuffered interrupt-driven "A/Q" channels or buffered Direct Storage Access channels.

Software
The main operating systems for the 1700 were the Utility System, which usually took the form of several punched paper tapes (resident monitor plus utilities), a similar Operating System for larger configurations (often including punched cards and magnetic tape), and the Mass Storage Operating System (MSOS) for disk-based systems.  

An assembler and a Fortran compiler were available.  Pascal was also available, via a cross compiler on a CDC 6000 series host. The Cyber 18 series, exploiting the extended instruction set, ran a disk-based OS, the Interactive Terminal Oriented System (ITOS).  This system supported Fortran, Cobol, and UCSD Pascal.  ITOS was a foreground/background system with multiple users connected via serial CRT terminals; user tasks ran in the background while the operating system itself ran in the foreground.

Market acceptance
The 1700 series found use as communications concentrators, Digigraphics workstations, remote batch job entry stations, and industrial process controllers. One application, running the AUTRAN program, controlled water and wastewater treatment plants for many years.  Another was used as Maintenance and Diagnostic SubSystem (M&DSS) for the  AN/FPQ-16 Perimeter Acquisition Radar Attack Characterization System (PARCS), located at Cavalier Air Force Station (CAFS) in North Dakota; this CDC 1700 is still being used as of this writing (2016). 

Washington, DC used a Control Data 1700 in vote-tallying. CDC's 1700 was also used by Ticketron as central servers for their wagering systems and ticketing services.

Simulation
In mid-2016, John Forecast added a CDC 1700 simulator to the SIMH package.

Photos
 CDC 1700 Control Panel
 Control Data 1700

References

Philips Technical Review, Volume 36, 1976, No., p.162 ff.
Computer-aided design by Peter Blume:
An early application of the CDC 1700 Digigraphic: shows in Fig. 4 a complete schematic of the computer configuration and in Fig. 5 a picture of the Digigraphic display
Abstract:.... Work has been in progress at the Philips Laboratories in Hamburg since 1973 ... on an integrated computer system in which parts are completely detailed in 
a dialogue between  the designer and a computer via  an "interactive display" ...

The mentioned display is the display of the CDC 1700 Digigraphic.
Fig. 4 Figure caption: The CDC 1700 Digigraphic computer system for the graphic processing of data. The interactive display is connected to the CD 1704 central processor via a control unit with
a "picture store"; the computer itself has the usual mass stores and peripheral equipment.
Information from the computer store can be displayed on the screen of the picture tube and can be altered or added to by using a light pen and keyboards connected to the
interactive display. This means that very fast input of both alphanumeric and graphic information is possible, while the input can be verified immediately on the screen.

External links
 CDC 1700 Reference Manual (September 1965)

1700
Minicomputers
16-bit computers